Events from the year 1770 in Spain

Incumbents
 Monarch – Charles IV

Events

 - Zoo Aquarium de Madrid

Births

Deaths

References

 
1770s in Spain
Years of the 18th century in Spain